Porfirio Jiménez can refer to:

 Porfirio Jiménez (Bolivian footballer)
 Porfirio Jiménez (Mexican footballer)